Blanford's lark or Blanford's short-toed lark (Calandrella blanfordi) is a small passerine bird of the lark family, Alaudidae, which is native to north-eastern Africa. Its common name commemorates the English zoologist William Thomas Blanford.

Taxonomy and systematics
Blanford's lark was formerly included in either the greater short-toed lark (C. brachydactyla) or the red-capped lark (C. cinerea) but is now commonly treated as a separate species.  Alternate names for Blanford's lark include Blandford's lark, Blandford's short-toed lark and Blanford's red-capped lark.

Subspecies
Two subspecies are recognized: 
 C. b. blanfordi - (Shelley, 1902): Found in northern Eritrea
 C. b. erlangeri - Erlanger's lark- (Neumann, 1906): Found in Ethiopia

Description
Blanford's lark is 14–15 centimetres long. The upperparts are pale sandy-brown with some darker streaking and the crown is rufous. The underparts are pale and plain apart from a small dark patch on the side of the neck made up of vertical streaks. The greater short-toed lark is similar but has a greyer, more-streaked crown. Erlanger's and red-capped larks have darker upperparts with more streaking and a darker rufous crown. Erlanger's lark has larger dark neck-patches while in red-capped lark the patches are rufous.

Blanford's lark has a sparrow-like flight-call. The song is given in a circular song-flight and includes a mixture of chew-chew-chew-chew notes and fluid phrases.

Habitat and movements
They occur on open stony plains, often with bushes. In Arabia, it breeds between 1800 and 2500 metres above sea-level with some birds dispersing to lower ground in winter. The species is often seen in flocks outside the breeding season.

References

 Arlott, Norman (2007) Birds of the Palearctic: Passerines, HarperCollins, London.
 Beolens, Bo & Watkins, Michael (2003) Whose Bird?: Men and women commemorated in the common names of birds, Christopher Helm, London.
 Hollom, P. A. D.; Porter, R. F.; Christensen, S. & Willis, Ian (1988) Birds of the Middle East and North Africa, T & AD Poyser, Calton, England.
 Sinclair, Ian & Ryan, Peter (2003) Birds of Africa south of the Sahara, Struik, Cape Town.

Blanford's lark
Birds of the Horn of Africa
Birds of the Middle East
Blanford's lark